The National Physical Activity Guidelines are a set of guidelines set up by the Australian government due to the increase of obesity within the Australian Nation, and due to the increasing medical bills from obesity related diseases such as Heart Disease, Congestive Heart Failure, Strokes and other deadly diseases. The Australian Government has also put in many exercise related plans such as the Governor's 30 Day Family Challenge and the many fun runs.

Being active 
The Australian Government has promoted being active for them to save money on hospitals so they can re-direct that into more important things like the current recession and re-building the destroyed homes and lives of the Black Saturday victims.

The 4 guidelines 
The guidelines are directed at adults (scroll lower for children's guidelines).

1. See movement as an opportunity, not an inconvenience. 

2. Be active every day in as many ways as possible. 

3. Put together at least 30 minutes of moderate to vigorous physical activity on most, preferably all days.

4. If it is possible, enjoy some regular vigorous activity for extra health and fun.

The types of physical activity 
Occupational Activity - This type of activity is sustained from all exercise undertaken at a place of work. This could include running/walking up and down stairs or if for labourers, the hard labour that is undertaken. This also includes schools for children.

Active Transport - This means that the activity undertaken instead of driving a car. Alternatives include walking, running, or riding a bike or many other fun activities to get from point A to point B.

Leisure Time Activity - This includes all of the activity included in an individual's leisure time. It could be taking leisurely walks or doing sports such as football or soccer. It also includes doing exercise to keep fit like running and going to the gym to work out.

Household/Gardening Activity - This consists of all the exercise achieved by doing chores around the house and in the garden. i.e. mowing the lawn, and vacuuming the house.

NPAG table 
Children (5–12) – At least 60 minutes (up to several hours is recommended) of moderate to vigorous physical activity per day, with focus on developing motor skills and having fun – no more than two hours per day surfing the net, watching TV or playing video games.

Youth (12–18) – At least 60 minutes of moderate to vigorous physical activity per day and no more than two hours using electronic media (unless educational).

Overweight and obese – Begin slowly, working up to 60 minutes per day of moderate to vigorous activity, being sure to not overdo it to cause injury, then increase to 60–90 minutes to avoid weight gain.

Older people – Should follow Adult guidelines – strength and balance training also recommended.

Diseases 
High blood pressure, hypertension - One-third of all cases of high blood pressure are associated with obesity. High blood pressure is twice as common in adults who are obese than in those who are at a healthy weight.

High blood cholesterol - 50% more likely to have elevated blood cholesterol levels.

Diabetes Type 2 - Non-insulin dependent accounts for nearly 90% of all cases of diabetes. Researchers estimate that 88 to 97% of type 2 diabetes cases diagnosed in overweight people are a direct result of obesity.

Congestive heart failure - Obesity increases the risk of congestive heart failure, a potentially fatal condition in which the heart muscle weakens, progressively losing the ability to pump blood.

Heart disease - Heart attack, congestive heart failure, sudden cardiac death, angina or chest pain, and abnormal heart rhythm is increased in persons who are overweight or obese.

Stroke - There is a link between obesity and stroke; this is particularly the case for people whose fat is situated predominantly in the abdominal region. Overweight people are more likely to have high blood cholesterol levels and high blood pressure, but these associations are not the only explanations for the greater stroke rate.

Gallstones and gall bladder disorders

Gout - The chance this condition may develop in people with obesity incidents are remarkably higher than people who are at a healthy weight, gout is strongly associated with obesity.

Osteoarthritis - Obesity may be a major factor in the development of osteoarthritis, particularly of the knee and especially in women.

Cancer -Duch as endometrial, breast, prostate, and colon cancers.

Complications of pregnancy

Poor female reproductive health - Examples would be menstrual irregularities, infertility, and irregular ovulation.

Bladder control problems - Such as stress incontinence.

Psychological disorders -Such as depression, eating disorders, distorted body image, and low self-esteem.

Obesity